Robert John Brunkhorst (born December 5, 1965) is an American politician in the state of Iowa.

He was born in Waverly, Iowa. He attended Loras College and is a computer analyst. He served in the Iowa House of Representatives from 1992 to 2002, and the Iowa State Senate from 2002 to 2005. . From 2009 to 2013, he served as mayor of Waverly, Iowa.

References

1965 births
Living people
People from Waverly, Iowa
Republican Party members of the Iowa House of Representatives
Loras College alumni
Republican Party Iowa state senators
Mayors of places in Iowa